The 1957 Pittsburg State Gorillas football team was an American football team that represented Pittsburg State College (now known as Pittsburg State University) as a member of the Central Intercollegiate Conference (CIC) during the 1957 NAIA football season. In their ninth season under head coach Carnie Smith, the Gorillas compiled a perfect 11–0 record (5–0 against CIC opponents) and outscored opponents by a total of 347 to 79. They won the CIC championship and defeated , 27–26, before a national television audience in the Holiday Bowl to win the NAIA championship.

Carnie Smith was the unanimous pick as the CIC Coach of the Year, and Tom Miller was named the CIC Lineman of the Year.  A total of eleven Pittsburg State players were included on the All-CIC teams selected by the United Press (UP): quarterback John Matous (UP-2); halfbacks Dick Adamson (UP-1) and Bill Samuels (UP-2); fullback John Ewing (UP-1); end Carroll Cobble (UP-1); tackles Ted Stahura (UP-1) and Leonard Mansfield (UP-1); guards Miller (UP-1) and Kenny Yoss (UP-2); and center Robert Gordon (UP-2).

Schedule

References

Pittsburg State
Pittsburg State Gorillas football seasons
NAIA Football National Champions
College football undefeated seasons
Pittsburg State Gorillas football